Socio-Economic Indexes for Areas (commonly known by its acronym, SEIFA) is a product that enables the assessment of the welfare of Australian communities. The indexes have been created by the Australian Bureau of Statistics, the national statistical agency. The source of the data is derived from the five-yearly Census of Population and Housing, and is calculated using principal component analysis.

Domains and variables 
First produced in 1971, SEIFA is primarily used to rank areas according to socio-economic advantage and disadvantage based on census data. The census variables used cover a number of domains and include household income, education, employment, occupation, housing and other indicators of advantage and disadvantage. Combined, the indexes provide more general measures of socio-economic status than is given by measuring one of the domains in isolation. SEIFA consists of four indexes, each being a summary of a different set of census variables:

Calculation method 
Principal Component Analysis is used to create SEIFA. This method creates a summary measure of a group of variables, in this case related to socio-economic advantage and disadvantage.

In a paper presented by the Queensland Department of Aboriginal and Torres Strait Islander Policy at the Australian Population Association 2004 conference, it was claimed that SEIFA was not an accurate measure of social and economic disadvantage for indigenous Australians, especially where SEIFA is used at a small area level, and the populations or households in each area are relatively homogeneous.

Publication 
SEIFA is published every five years. Formerly available only to subscribers, SEIFA was made available for free on the Australian Bureau of Statistics website after changes in legislation relating to all Australian Bureau of Statistics electronic products in 2005–06. SEIFA is used by federal, state and local government agencies as well as community and business groups. The most recent issue is based on the 2011 Australian census which was released in March 2013.

See also 
 Australian Bureau of Statistics
 Census in Australia
 Tony Vinson

References

External links 
 Census of Population and Housing: Socio-Economic Indexes for Areas (SEIFA), Australia, 2011  on the Australian Bureau of Statistics website
 Census of Population and Housing: Socio-Economic Indexes for Areas (SEIFA), Australia, 2011   Frequently Asked Questions, SEIFA 2011

Demographics of Australia